Yours Forever is the fifth studio album by American band Atlantic Starr. This album features the hit single "Touch a Four Leaf Clover." Yours Forever was the last album to feature Sharon Bryant as a lead vocalist before she departed the group to pursue a solo career. This was also the last album to be produced by James Anthony Carmichael, who was responsible for the group's two previous albums.

Track listing
"Yours Forever" (David Lewis) - 5:04
"Touch a Four Leaf Clover" (David Lewis, Wayne Lewis) - 4:38
"More, More, More" (Sam Dees) - 4:42
"I Want Your Love" (Jonathan Lewis, Wayne Lewis) - 4:52
"Second to None" (Sharon Bryant, Joseph Phillips) - 4:38
"Island Dream" (David Lewis, Wayne Lewis) - 4:49
"Who Could Love You Better?" (Clifford Archer, Wayne Lewis) - 4:30
"More Time for Me" (Maxi Anderson, Nicki Johnson) - 3:42
"Tryin'" (Deborah Thomas, David Cochrane) - 3:28

Personnel
Atlantic Starr
 Sharon Bryant – lead vocals (2, 3, 5, 8, 9), backing vocals 
 Wayne Lewis – keyboards, lead vocals (3, 4, 7), backing vocals 
 David Lewis – guitar, lead vocals (1, 6, 8), backing vocals 
 Clifford Archer – bass
 Porter Carroll, Jr. – drums, backing vocals
 Joseph Phillips – percussion
 Koran Daniels – saxophones
 Jonathan Lewis – trombone
 William Suddeth III – trumpet

Additional musicians
 Michael Boddicker – synthesizers
 Greg Phillinganes – synthesizers
 Paulinho Da Costa – percussion

Arrangements 
 James Anthony Carmichael (1-9)
 Wayne Lewis (1, 2, 4, 6, 7)
 David Lewis (1, 2, 4, 6, 7)
 Atlantic Starr (3, 5, 8, 9)

Production
 James Anthony Carmichael – producer 
 Calvin Harris – engineer, mixing
 Fred Law – additional engineer
 Bruce Robbins – assistant engineer
 Ralph Sutton – assistant engineer
 Bernie Grundman – mastering at A&M Studios (Hollywood, CA).
 Leslie Jean Bart – back cover photography
 Diem Jones – inner sleeve photography
 Richard Fuggetta – front cover design 
 Roderick Taylor – art direction, logo design

Charts

Weekly charts

Year-end charts

References

Atlantic Starr albums
1983 albums
A&M Records albums
Albums produced by James Anthony Carmichael